Sebastian Tounekti (born 13 July 2002) is a professional footballer who plays as a winger for Haugesund. Born in Norway, he represents the Tunisia national team.

Club career
Tounekti was born in Tromsø. He made his senior debut for Tromsdalen on 30 September 2018 against Ullensaker/Kisa; Tromsdalen won 3–0.

He made his senior debut for Bodø/Glimt on 16 June 2020 against Viking; Bodø/Glimt won 4–2. He scored his first and only goal in October 2020 against Molde. Tounekti and George Lewis were both players at Tromsdalen who were discovered by clubs other than Tromsdalen's larger neighbour Tromsø IL, the failure to pick them up being lamented by Tromsø fans.

International career
Tounekti was born in Norway and is of Tunisian descent. He was a youth international for Norway up until U19 level. He was called up to represent the senior Tunisia national team on 19 March 2021. He debuted with Tunisia in a 3–0 2022 FIFA World Cup qualification win over Mauritania on 7 October 2021.

Career statistics

Club

Honours
Bodø/Glimt
Eliteserien: 2020

References

2002 births
Living people
Norwegian people of Tunisian descent
Sportspeople from Tromsø
Tunisian footballers
Norwegian footballers
Association football midfielders
Tunisia international footballers
Norway youth international footballers
Norwegian First Division players
Eliteserien players
Tromsdalen UIL players
FK Bodø/Glimt players
FC Groningen players
Tunisian expatriate footballers
Expatriate footballers in the Netherlands
Tunisian expatriate sportspeople in the Netherlands